Kaoteon is an extreme metal band, based in the Netherlands, officially formed in 1998 by Anthony Kaoteon.

Biography
Kaoteon is an extreme metal band with origins in Lebanon. The band was formed in war torn Beirut as a one-man band in 1998 by Anthony Kaoteon under the name Chaotaeon (from the merger of "chaotic" and "aeon"). They changed their name after an incident with the authorities in which they got arrested. The police thought that "Chaotaeon" was the translation of "devils" from Arabic. The members were detained for days during a heavy investigation which led to false accusations that the band is Satanic.

Kaoteon released Damnatio Memoriae on 23 February 2018 that featured Frederick Widigs on drums (Marduk) and Linus Klausenitzer on bass (Obscura).

On 24 February 2018 the band performed at Complexity Fest with The Faceless and Sikth, and were joined by Simon Schilling (ex-Belphegor and current Marduk drummer).

On the 11th of June, Kaoteon were awarded the "Global Metal" award at the 2018 Metal Hammer Golden Gods Awards. Shortly after, Anthony started working on a follow up album that was released on 17 January 2020 featuring Adrian Erlandsson on drums (At the Gates) and Linus Klausenitzer on bass (Obscura). The self titled album was listed as one of the top albums for the year under several lists of best albums of the year 2020 in Extreme metal. This album was the bridge between the old Kaoteon and what soon becomes a more mature sound which gave birth to their 4th full length album in 2022 entitled "Neither God Nor Master". The album was listed as #8 best black metal album of the year 2022 on Metal Hammer UK. The album receives a lot of positive reviews across the globe and helped the band reach audiences from all corners of the world.

Kaoteon's composer 'Anthony'had a wrist injury by end of 2022 which prevented him from continuing the recording of the 5th album that was supposed to be more experimental than previous works.

Discography
Studio albums
 Provenance of Hatred – 2003 by Unsung Heroes Records (USA), Extreminal Records (Turkey) and Ketzer Records (Russia) on CD and by Diabolical Masquerade (Netherlands) as a tape
 Veni Vidi Vomui – 2011 by Osmose Productions
 Damnatio Memoriae – 23 February 2018
 Kaoteon - 17 January 2020

Singles
 "Anthem of the Dead" – 2008
 "The Hunt for Life" - Feb 2022

Awards
 "Global Metal" award by Metal Hammer Golden Gods Awards 2018

Members

Current members 
 Anthony Kaoteon – guitarist/composer/founder (bass on demos and Veni Vidi Vomui) (1998–present)

Former members 
 Walid WolfLust – all vocals/lyrics (2001–2020)
 Ziad Alam - drums (2006-2014)
 Riad Hajjar - drums (2003-2004)
 Sami Khawam - bass (2001-2002)
 Bernard Moussalli - guitars (2001)
 Roger Moussalli - drums (2001)
 Georges Daou - guitars (2000)

Session members 

 Terry Stooker – vocals on Neither God Nor Master (2022)
 Adrian Erlandsson – drums on Kaoteon (2020) and Neither God Nor Master (2022)
 Linus Klausenitzer – bass on Damnatio Memoriae (2018), Kaoteon (2020) and The Hunt For Life (2022)
 Fredrik Widigs – drums on Damnatio Memoriae (2018)

References

"Kaoteon Want to Smash 'Middle Eastern Metal' Stereotypes", Vice Media, 16 February 2018.

External links

Kaoteon profile on Metal Archives

Lebanese heavy metal musical groups
Black metal musical groups
Death metal musical groups
Musical groups established in 2000